The men's tournament was held from 26 June to 5 July 2015.

Preliminary round

Pool A

|}

|}

Pool B

|}

|}

Pool C

|}

|}

Pool D

|}

|}

Pool E

|}

|}

Pool F

|}

|}

Pool G

|}

|}

Pool H

|}

|}

Pool I

|}

|}

Pool J

|}

|}

Pool K

|}

|}

Pool L

|}

|}

3rd place ranked teams
The eight best third-placed teams advanced to the round of 32.

|}

Knockout stage
A draw was held to determine the pairings.

Round of 32

|}

Round of 16

|}

Quarterfinals

|}

Semifinals

|}

Third place game

|}

Final

|}

References

External links
Official website

Men